The 1957 Miami Hurricanes football team represented the University of Miami as an independent during the 1957 NCAA University Division football season. Led by tenth-year head coach Andy Gustafson, the Hurricanes played their home games at Burdine Stadium in Miami, Florida. Miami finished the season 5–4–1.

Schedule

Roster
 Jim Otto, So.

References

Miami
Miami Hurricanes football seasons
Miami Hurricanes football